The 1981 Gael Linn Cup, the most important representative competition for elite level participants in the women's team field sport of camogie, was won by Leinster, who defeated Ulster in the final, played at Russell Park.

Arrangements
Leinster narrowly defeated Munster 3–9 to 2–11 in the semi-final at Russell Park and then beat Ulster in the final at the same venue by 3–10 to 2–4.
Connacht defeated Ulster 5–1 to 3–2 in the trophy semi-final at Eglish in the semi-final and then defeated Munster by 2–3 to 2–2 at Russell Park.

Final stages

|}

Junior Final

|}

References

External links
 Camogie Association

1981 in camogie
1981
Cam